J.U.F. is a collaboration between Gogol Bordello and Tamir Muskat released in 2004 by Stinky Records. The name—an abbreviation for Jewish Ukrainian Freundschaft—is inspired  by German industrial band Deutsch Amerikanische Freundschaft, who got their name from the GDR state organization Deutsch-Sowjetische Freundschaft (German-Soviet Friendship).

Track listing

External links
J.U.F. Artist website
J.U.F.'s Official Myspace
Gogol Bordello's Official Myspace
Gogol Bordello's Official Website
Balkan Beatbox's Official Website
Balkan Beat Box Official Myspace

2004 albums
Gogol Bordello albums